The Boucle du Baoulé National Park lies in western Mali, in Kayes Region and Koulikoro Region, set up in 1982.  It has an area of 25,330 km² but has little large wildlife.  The park is known for its prehistoric rock art and tombs.  It is part of the UNESCO "Bouce Du Baoule Biosphere Reserve", along with Badinko Faunal Reserve to the southwest, Fina Faunal Reserve to the south, and  Kongossambougou Faunal Reserve to the northeast.

The park
Mali is one of the sub-Saharan countries most affected by drought and over-grazing by livestock, putting its ecology and biodiversity under pressure. The Boucle du Baoulé National Park was created to try to address this issue. It is part of a complex which also includes the Badinko Faunal Reserve, the Fina Faunal Reserve, the Kongossambougou Faunal Reserve and the Bossofola Forest Reserve. These preserved areas consist of desert and semi-desert areas, and include dry, lightly-wooded savannah, riverine forest and thorn scrub. Much of the large animal population in the country occurs in these types of habitat.

Management of the park comes under the National Parks Department of the Ministry of Natural Resources and Animal Husbandry. However the International Union for Conservation of Nature considers that the control of protected areas within the country has been ineffective, with continuing illegal hunting and encroachment on the reserves by villagers for pastoralism and agriculture.

A population of the critically endangered Western chimpanzee is present in the park, where it faces threats from poaching and habitat destruction.

World Heritage Status 
This site was added to the UNESCO World Heritage Tentative List on September 8, 1999, as a biosphere reserve in the Cultural category.

References

Rock art in Africa
National parks of Mali
Biosphere reserves of Mali
Kayes Region
Koulikoro Region